Terry Paul Hawkridge (born 23 February 1990) is an English professional footballer who plays as a winger for Worksop Town. 

He previously played in the Football League for Scunthorpe United, Mansfield Town and Notts County, and in non-league football for Carlton Town, Hucknall Town, Gainsborough Trinity, Lincoln City, Solihull Moors, Boston United, Basford United and Matlock Town.

Career

Non-league
Hawkridge was born in Nottingham, Nottinghamshire. After playing youth football for Barnsley and Tranmere Rovers, he signed a one-year senior contract with Carlton Town in August 2008. He was released a year later, after appearing just twice with the first team, and subsequently signed for Hucknall Town. However, in September 2010, Hawkridge returned to Carlton Town, after he was deemed surplus to requirements at Hucknall.

In August 2012, Hawkridge signed for Gainsborough Trinity of the Conference North. He scored 6 goals from in 37 league matches, and was an instrumental part of the team.

Scunthorpe United
On 4 June 2013, Hawkridge signed a one-year deal with League Two club Scunthorpe United for an undisclosed fee, along with Trinity teammate Luke Waterfall who had both followed chairman Peter Swann to the club. He made his professional debut on 3 August, providing assists for both goals in a 2–0 home win against Mansfield Town.

Lincoln City
On 1 September 2015, Hawkridge joined Lincoln City on loan until the following January. This was then followed by an 18-month contract to take him to the end of the 2016–17 season. In the last game of that season, and his last game for Lincoln, Hawkridge scored both goals as Lincoln won the 2016–17 National League title.

Notts County
On 18 May 2017, Hawkridge signed a two-year contract with Notts County. However, the contract was terminated in January 2019.

Solihull Moors
Hawkridge next signed for Solihull Moors.

Boston United
After 18 months with Solihull Moors, Hawkridge signed for National League North club Boston United on 1 September 2020. He moved on to Basford United of the Northern Premier League Premier Division a year later.

Matlock Town
On 17 January 2022, he joined Northern Premier League Premier Division rivals Matlock Town for an undisclosed fee along with Marcus Marshall.

Worksop Town
On 11 June 2022, Hawkridge joined Northern Premier League Division One East club Worksop Town.

Career statistics

Honours

Club

Lincoln City
National League: 2016–17

References

External links
Scunthorpe United official profile

1990 births
Living people
Footballers from Nottingham
English footballers
Association football wingers
Carlton Town F.C. players
Hucknall Town F.C. players
Gainsborough Trinity F.C. players
Scunthorpe United F.C. players
Mansfield Town F.C. players
Lincoln City F.C. players
Notts County F.C. players
Solihull Moors F.C. players
Boston United F.C. players
Basford United F.C. players
Matlock Town F.C. players
Worksop Town F.C. players
English Football League players
National League (English football) players
Northern Counties East Football League players
Northern Premier League players